Arcades railway station (Dutch: Station Arcaden, French: Gare des Arcades) is a railway station located in the municipality of Watermael-Boitsfort in Brussels, Belgium. It is served by the Brussels Regional Express Network operated by the National Railway Company of Belgium. The station has 2 platforms and is wheelchair accessible.

History
Originally built between 2005 and 2009 at a cost of about 1 million euros, the station stood unused for years due to lack of accessibility and delays in developing the network it was intended to serve. In 2011 its opening was pushed back to 2019, making it a controversial example of wastefulness in infrastructure spending. The station finally opened in 2016.

Train services 
The station is served by the following service:

 Brussels RER services (S7) Mechelen - Merode - Halle (weekdays only)

References

Railway stations in Brussels
Railway stations opened in 2016